"Your Good Thing (Is About to End)" is a song written by Isaac Hayes and David Porter. The song was originally recorded by Mable John in 1966. It peaked at number 95 on the Billboard Hot 100 and number 6 on the R&B Charts.

Lou Rawls recording
In 1969, a version was released as a single by Lou Rawls, from his album The Way It Was: The Way It Is. His version reached number 18 on the Billboard Hot 100, and number 3 on the Hot Rhythm and Blues Singles chart.

Additional cover versions
"Your Good Thing (Is About to End)" has been recorded by various artists for over 50 years.

References

1966 singles
1969 singles
Lou Rawls songs
Songs written by Isaac Hayes
Songs written by David Porter (musician)
1966 songs
Capitol Records singles